Simon Youl was the defending champion, but did not participate this year.

Ramesh Krishnan won the tournament, beating Kelly Evernden in the final, 6–1, 6–1.

Seeds
The top four seeds received a bye into the second round.

  Martín Jaite (semifinals)
  Amos Mansdorf (quarterfinals)
  Jaime Yzaga (second round)
  Alberto Mancini (second round)
  Milan Šrejber (second round)
  Aki Rahunen (first round)
  Kelly Evernden (final)
  Derrick Rostagno (first round)

Draw

Finals

Top half

Bottom half

References

  Main Draw

OTB Open
OTB International Open